The 2008 ICC Americas Championship Division One was a cricket tournament in the United States, taking place between 25 and 30 November 2010. It gave six North and South American Associate and Affiliate members of the International Cricket Council experience of international one-day cricket.

Teams
There were 6 teams that played in the tournament. These teams were non-test member nations of the Americas Cricket Association. The teams that played were:

Squads

Group stage

Points table

Results

International cricket competitions in 2008
ICC Americas Championship
2008 in North American sport
International cricket competitions in the United States
ICC Americas
Cricket in Florida